Jared Keeso (born July 1, 1984) is a Canadian actor, screenwriter, and producer. He is best known for creating and starring in the comedy series Letterkenny (2016–present), which won a Canadian Screen Award for Best Comedy Series in 2017. He is also known for his roles as Ben Chartier in the 2014 series 19-2 (2014–2017), for which he won a Canadian Screen Award, as Don Cherry in the television films Keep Your Head Up Kid: The Don Cherry Story (2010) and The Wrath of Grapes: The Don Cherry Story II (2012), for which he won a Leo Award and Gemini Award.

Early life
Keeso was born in Listowel, Ontario, on July 1, 1984, the son of Anne and Richard Keeso. His family owned and operated the Keeso Sawmill Company, which was founded in 1872, and Keeso spent several years working in the sawmill before embarking on his acting career. The sawmill was destroyed by a fire on September 9, 2018. As a youth, like most boys his age in town, Keeso played junior hockey; he played for the Strathroy Rockets of the WOHL with future two-time Stanley Cup champion Jeff Carter, and also the Listowel Cyclones of the GOJHL.

Career
Keeso starred as hockey coach, player, and commentator Don Cherry in two CBC television movies about Cherry's life. The first, Keep Your Head Up Kid: The Don Cherry Story, aired in early 2010, and was followed by The Wrath of Grapes: The Don Cherry Story II in 2012. For his performances, he won a Leo Award for Best Lead Performance by a Male in a Feature Length Drama and a Gemini Award for Best Performance by an Actor in a Leading Role in a Dramatic Program or Mini-Series.

In 2013, Keeso and Mike Borden created Play Fun Games Pictures on YouTube. The channel became an immediate success thanks to a series of shorts sketches depicting the quintessential Canadian farmer and the associated struggles. The series, Letterkenny Problems, has attracted over 100 million views, and became the basis for the hit 2016 sitcom Letterkenny. The sketches and TV series are both shot in Sudbury, Ontario.

In 2014, Keeso starred in a Heritage Minute about the Winnipeg Falcons, a team of Icelandic-Canadian hockey players who served in the First World War, and later won the country's first Olympic Gold medal in hockey.

Following the cult like success of Letterkenny, in 2022 Keeso created a spin off series focusing on the titular character of Shoresy which is also set and shot in Sudbury.

Keeso has had a variety of other roles in both television series and movies, including as Ben Chartier in the 2014 English-language adaptation of 19-2, for which he won a Canadian Screen Award for Best Performance by an Actor in a Continuing Leading Dramatic Role. He also has less prominent roles in a few other films, such as Nicholas in Smokin' Aces 2: Assassins' Ball; Adam in the high-school themed Lifetime original movie Seven Deadly Sins; and Simon in the drug-themed Charlie.

Filmography

Film

Television

Awards and nominations

References

External links

1984 births
Canadian male film actors
Canadian male television actors
Living people
Male actors from Ontario
Canadian people of English descent
Canadian people of Scottish descent
Canadian people of German descent
People from Perth County, Ontario
Best Actor in a Comedy Series Canadian Screen Award winners
Best Actor in a Drama Series Canadian Screen Award winners